Min Buri is one of the 50 districts (khet) of Bangkok, Thailand. It is bounded by other Bangkok districts (from north clockwise): Khlong Sam Wa, Nong Chok, Lat Krabang, Saphan Sung, and Khan Na Yao. Min Buri is the fifth largest district in Bangkok.

History
The district was once a province established in 1901 during the reign of King Chulalongkorn. It consisted of Khlong Sam Wa district, Saen Saep district, Nong Chok district, and  Chia Radap District (เจียรดับ). The name Min Buri (meaning 'city of fish') was chosen to go with the existing Thanyaburi province (meaning 'city of rice'). Economic problems during 1930-1931 caused the government to disband various organizations to reduce expenses. Min Buri Province was eliminated and turned into amphoe (district) Min Buri and Lat Krabang district of Bangkok, and Nong Chok district of Chachoengsao province. In 1957 part of Saen Saep subdistrict of Lat Krabang was transferred to Min Buri. In 1997, the northern part of Min Buri was split off to form the new Khlong Sam Wa District.

Administration
The district is divided into two sub-districts (khwaengs).

District council
The district council for Min Buri has seven members, who each serve four-year terms. Elections were last held on 30 April 2006. The results were as follows:
Democrat Party: seven seats

Places

Museums
 Min Buri Local Museum (Formerly Min Buri City Hall)
 Small Barge Museum

Markets
 Min Buri Old Market
 Chatuchak Weekend Market 2, Min Buri
 Khwan Riam Floating Market

Public Park
 Rama IX Commemoration Park (สวนเฉลิมพระเกียรติ ร.9 มีนบุรี)

Temples
 Wat Bang Pheng Tai (วัดบางเพ็งใต้)
 Wat Bamphen Nuea (วัดบำเพ็ญเหนือ) 
 Wat Saen Suk (วัดแสนสุข)

Education

 Kasem Bundit University Romklao Campus
 Minburi Discovery Learning Library
 Setthabutbamphen School
 Satrisetthabutbamphen School
 Minburi Technical College
 Kanchanaphisek Technical College Mahanakorn
 Minprasatwittaya School
 Bromsgrove International School Thailand (early years campus and primary and secondary campus)
 RIS Swiss Section-Deutschsprachige Schule Bangkok
 Ruamrudee International School
 Josuikan Bangkok International School

Sports
 72nd Anniversary Stadium

Industrial estate
 Bangchan Industrial Estate

References

External links

 BMA website with the tourist landmarks of Min Buri
 Min Buri district office (Thai only)

 
Districts of Bangkok